Adolphe Lemoine (1812–1880), known as Lemoine-Montigny or Montigny, was a French comedian and playwright. He was also the director of the Théâtre du Gymnase.

He married the comic-actress Rose Chéri. He was the uncle of the comic-actress Anna Judic.

Theatre 
 1832: Norbert ou le Campagnard, one-act vaudevillian comedy
 1834:  Le Doigt île Dieu, one-act drama, Théâtre de l'Ambigu-Comique  
 1834:  Une Chanson, three-act vaudevillian drama, Ambigu-Comique 
 1836: Un fils, three-act drama, Ambigu-Comique 
 1836: Wilson, ou une Calomnie, three-act drama
 1836: Amazanpo ou la Découverte du quinquina, drama in four acts and seven scenes 
 1836: La Sœur grise et l'Orphelin, melodrama in four acts and five scenes

References

1812 births
1880 deaths
French male stage actors
19th-century French dramatists and playwrights
19th-century French male actors
19th-century French male writers